Nikola Hartmann (born 5 June 1975) is an Austrian freestyle wrestler. She won five gold medals at the World Wrestling Championships: in 1993, 1994, 1995, 1998 and 2000.

References

External links 
 

Living people
1975 births
Place of birth missing (living people)
Austrian female sport wrestlers
World Wrestling Championships medalists
20th-century Austrian women